Basan may refer to:
 Basan (legendary bird), in Japanese folklore
 Basan (character), a fictional character in The Song of Roland
 Bashan, or Basan, a Biblical region
 Bażany, Basan in German, a village in Poland
 , a village in Polohy Raion, Ukraine
  and Nova Basan, villages in Nizhyn Raion, Ukraine
 Basan (crater), a geological features on Iapetus
 Basan (leather), sheepskin tanned in oak- or larch-bark, and used for bookbinding, etc.

People with the name 
 Eadwig Basan, eleventh-century English monk and scribe
 Pierre-François Basan (1723–1797), French engraver
 Ghillie Basan (born 1962), Scottish writer and cook

See also 
 Basin (disambiguation)
 Bassan (disambiguation)
 Bazan (disambiguation)